Pedro José Varela Olivera (22 February 1837, Florida, Uruguay –  1906, Montevideo, Uruguay)  was a politician and member of the Uruguayan Colorado Party. He was president of Uruguay from February to March 1868 and from January 1875 to March 1876, when he resigned from office in favor of defense minister Lorenzo Latorre.

He served as the President of the Senate of Uruguay in 1868 and 1873.

References

1837 births
1906 deaths
Colorado Party (Uruguay) politicians
People from Florida Department
Presidents of Uruguay
Presidents of the Senate of Uruguay
19th-century Uruguayan people